Studiestræde 24 is a Neoclassical property on Studiestræde in the Latin Quarter of Copenhagen, Denmark. The building was listed in the Danish registry of protected buildings and places in 1959. The Red–Green Alliance is based in the building.

History
The eastern part of the building was constructed in 1797–1798. The decoration painter Georg Hilker was a resident in the building in 1866–67.

Theodor Rich established a chemical factory in Studiestræde 24 and some of the adjacent buildings. The product range included shoe polish, pomade, fish glue and baking powder. Rich expanded the building westwards in 1887–88. The factory was later continued by his descendents and remained at the site for more than 80 years.

The building was later for many years home to  Nordisk Hustelefonfabrik. It was also the first Danish premises of Dutch company Philips (1926) and Swedish company L. M. Ericsson (1930). The printing business Kruckow-Waldorff A/S (originally  Sophus Kruckow) was another tenant.

The Communist Workers Party purchased the entire building in 1978. The publishing house Oktober and the newspaper Arbejderavisen were also based in the building. They were from around 1980 joined by the image bureaus Alfa and 2. Maj were also based in the building on the upper floors. The Communist Workers Party's premises were in 1989 taken over by the Red–Green Alliance.

Architecture
The building is seven bays wide. The five eastern bays date from 1798 while the two western ones date from the extension in 1887–88. The facade is decorated with seven Ionic pilasters.

Today
The Red–Green Alliance is still headquartered in the building.

References 

Listed buildings and structures in Copenhagen
Buildings and structures completed in 1798